Quiéry-la-Motte is a commune in the Pas-de-Calais department in the Hauts-de-France region of France.

Geography
The A1 autoroute passes right by the commune.

Population

Places of interest
 The church of St.Martin, dating from the seventeenth century.
 A feudal motte.

See also
Communes of the Pas-de-Calais department

References

External links

 Official website of the commune 

Quierylamotte